Margarita Vladimirovna Levieva (born 9 February 1980) is a Russian-American actress.

Early life
Levieva was born in then Leningrad, Soviet Union (now Saint Petersburg, Russia), into a family of Russian-Jewish descent. Both of her grandmothers, as children, survived the siege of Leningrad during World War II. From the age of three she began to engage in rhythmic gymnastics.

Levieva emigrated to the United States at age 11 with her mother and twin brother Michael, and settled in Sheepshead Bay, Brooklyn. Though she was accepted into Laguardia High School to study dance, she instead attended public high school in Secaucus, New Jersey. In addition to working full-time as a fashion buyer, Levieva graduated a year early from New York University with a double major in economics and psychology and minors in philosophy, sociology, and Russian history. Levieva went on to complete the Meisner Acting Program at the William Esper Studio in New York.

Career
In 2005, Levieva made a guest appearance on Law & Order: Trial by Jury and in the following two years starred in the Fox series Vanished and feature films The Invisible, Billy's Choice, and Noise.

Levieva starred in the 2019 independent film Inherit the Viper. Her other film credits include It Happened In L.A. (2017), The Diary of a Teenage Girl (2015), Sleeping with Other People (2015), James White (2015), For Ellen (2012), The Lincoln Lawyer (2011), Adventureland (2009), and Spread (2009).

In 2009, Levieva made an appearance in the NBC drama Kings (in the episode "First Night"), starred in the play The Retributionists, and made her Broadway debut in Impressionism. She also starred in the HBO comedy-drama series How to Make it in America.

Levieva's television appearances include her series regular roles in ABC drama series Revenge (2011–2015) and in HBO series The Deuce (2016–2019). In The Deuce, Levieva played Abby Parker, an adventurous college student.

Levieva stars as Jenny Franklin in the 2022 Netflix series In From the Cold. Jenny is a single mother from Cherry Hill, New Jersey, who, during a European vacation with her daughter, finds her life turned upside down when the CIA forces her to confront her long-buried past as a Russian spy, the product of a secret KGB experiment that endowed her with "special abilities".

Filmography

Film

Television

Music videos

References

External links

 

1980 births
21st-century American actresses
Actresses from New Jersey
Actresses from New York City
Actresses from Saint Petersburg
American film actresses
American people of Russian-Jewish descent 
American television actresses
Jewish American actresses
Living people
New York University alumni
People from Secaucus, New Jersey
People from Sheepshead Bay, Brooklyn
Soviet emigrants to the United States
Soviet Jews
People with acquired American citizenship
21st-century American Jews